"Never Lost" is a song performed by American contemporary worship band Elevation Worship released as a standalone single, on November 1, 2019. The song was written by Chris Brown, Steven Furtick, and Tiffany Hammer. Chris Brown and Aaron Robertson handled the production of the single.

"Never Lost" debuted at No. 36 on the US Hot Christian Songs chart. Elevation Worship also released a live version of the song which featured Tauren Wells on their live album, Graves into Gardens (2020). This version of the song peaked at No. 31 on the Hot Christian Songs chart.

The song was notably covered by CeCe Winans, who released her version of the song on September 4, 2020, as the lead single to her live album, Believe for It (2021). CeCe Winan's single peaked at No. 2 on the Hot Gospel Songs chart. CeCe Winans' rendition of "Never Lost" was nominated for the GMA Dove Award Contemporary Gospel Recorded Song of the Year at the 2021 GMA Dove Awards. It won the Grammy Award for Best Gospel Performance/Song at the 2022 Grammy Awards.

Background
Elevation Worship released "Never Lost" as a standalone single, on November 1, 2019. Chris Brown spoke of the song, saying:

Composition

Commercial performance
"Never Lost" debuted at No. 36 on ''Billboards Hot Christian Songs chart dated November 16, 2019. The song spent a total of eleven weeks on the Hot Christian Songs chart.

Music videos
The lyric video of "Never Lost" was published on YouTube by Elevation Worship on May 1, 2020.  On May 13, 2020, Elevation Worship released "Never Lost" Backroom Session performance video on their YouTube channel. 

Track listing

Charts

Release history

Live version featuring Tauren Wells

On May 1, 2020, Elevation Worship released the live version of "Never Lost" featuring Tauren Wells as part of their eighth live album, Graves into Gardens.

Composition

Commercial performance
The live version of "Never Lost" debuted at No. 31 on Billboard'''s Hot Christian Songs chart dated May 16, 2020. The song spent a total of twenty-one weeks on the Hot Christian Songs chart.

Music videos
The lyric video of the song was published on YouTube by Elevation Worship on May 1, 2020.  On May 13, 2020, Elevation Worship released the live music video of "Never Lost" featuring Tauren Wells as the lead vocalist, recorded at Elevation Church's Ballantyne campus on their YouTube channel, 

Charts

Weekly charts

Year-end charts

CeCe Winans version

On September 4, 2020, CeCe Winans released her rendition of "Never Lost" as the lead single to her live album, Believe For It (2021). Kyle Lee handled the production of the single. The recording was nominated for the 2021 NAACP Image Award for Outstanding Gospel/Christian Song. CeCe Winans' rendition of "Never Lost" was nominated for the GMA Dove Award Contemporary Gospel Recorded Song of the Year at the 2021 GMA Dove Awards. It also won a Grammy Award for Best Gospel Performance/Song at the 2022 Grammy Awards.

Composition

Commercial performance
CeCe Winans' rendition of "Never Lost" debuted at No. 20 on Billboards Hot Gospel Songs chart dated September 19, 2020. The song spent a total of thirty-three weeks on the Hot Gospel Songs chart.

Music video
The lyric video of the song was published on YouTube by CeCe Winans on September 4, 2020. The video was directed by Calvin Nowell and Travis Flynn, and filmed at Rocketown, in Nashville, Tennessee.

Accolades

Track listing

Charts

Weekly charts

Year-end charts

Release history

Other versions
 Cain released a live performance version of the song as part of the Essential Worship Song Sessions series on YouTube.

References

External links
 

2019 singles
Elevation Worship songs
Tauren Wells songs
CeCe Winans songs 
Songs written by Steven Furtick
2019 songs